Narciso Lima Fernandes (born September 20, 1978) is an American former professional soccer player.

Career
Fernandes was drafted in the fifth round of the 2001 MLS SuperDraft (59th overall) by Kansas City Wizards where he made one appearance.  He also played for Pittsburgh Riverhounds, Rhode Island Stingrays and New Hampshire Phantoms.

References

External links

1978 births
Living people
American soccer players
Wisconsin Badgers men's soccer players
Sporting Kansas City players
Pittsburgh Riverhounds SC players
Rhode Island Stingrays players
Seacoast United Phantoms players
Association football midfielders
Soccer players from Massachusetts
Sporting Kansas City draft picks
Major League Soccer players
A-League (1995–2004) players
USL League Two players
USL Second Division players